Inner tubing may mean:

Inner tube, the rubber tube within certain tires
Tubing (recreation), the act of riding an inner tube